Balda Garden is a botanical garden which spans  of land located at Wari in the old part of the city of Dhaka, the capital of Bangladesh. It has a collection of 672 species of plants.
The Balda Garden is now managed as a satellite unit of the National Botanical Garden by the Department of Forestry.

Location On Google Maps

Balda Garden is one of the oldest Botanical Gardens in Bangladesh. The garden is enriched with rare plant species collected from different parts of the world.

History
Balda Garden is one of the oldest botanical gardens established in this part of Bengal. Narendra Narayan Roy Chaudhury, landlord of the Estate of Balda, began creating it in 1909 and continued to add to it until his death in 1943. He simultaneously built up a museum collection, which was known as the Balda Museum. The museum collections are now housed at the Bangladesh National Museum.

Gallery

See also 
 Christian cemetery in Wari

References

Bibliography

 Muntasir Mamun, Dhaka: Smriti Bismritir Nogory, Volume-2, Pg- 142–143, Annana Publications.
 Cultural Survey of Bangladesh, Asiatek Society, Architecture, Asiatek Society of Bangladesh.

Old Dhaka
Botanical gardens in Bangladesh
Parks in Dhaka